Tyssedal Church is a parish church of the Church of Norway in Ullensvang Municipality in Vestland county, Norway. It is located in the village of Tyssedal. It is the church for the Tyssedal parish which is part of the Hardanger og Voss prosti (deanery) in the Diocese of Bjørgvin. The white, brick church was built in a modern-looking rectangular design in 1965 using plans drawn up by the architect Aksel Fronth. The church seats about 190 people.

History
Starting in 1928, the people of Tyssedal began petitioning the government for their own church. It wasn't until the 1960s when their wish came true. A new church, including a full basement which has bathrooms and meeting rooms was designed by Aksel Fronth. The foundation stone was laid on 29 February 1964 and work carried on for about a year. The new church was consecrated on 4 April 1965 by the Bishop Per Juvkam.

See also
List of churches in Bjørgvin

References

Ullensvang
Churches in Vestland
Rectangular churches in Norway
Brick churches in Norway
20th-century Church of Norway church buildings
Churches completed in 1965
1965 establishments in Norway